Maud Cressall (1886–1962) was a British stage and film actress. Largely a theatre actress, she also appeared in nine silent films. She was at one point the protégé of W.S. Gilbert.

Filmography
 The Man and the Moment (1918)
 Whosoever Shall Offend (1919)
 Two Little Wooden Shoes (1920)
 The Scarlet Kiss (1920)
 The Barton Mystery (1920)
 The Tinted Venus (1921)
 Mist in the Valley (1923)
 Strangling Threads (1923)
 The Naked Man (1923)

References

Bibliography
 Stedman, Jane W. W.S. Gilbert: A Classic Victorian and His Theatre. Oxford University Press, 1996.

External links

1886 births
1962 deaths
English film actresses
English silent film actresses
20th-century English actresses
English stage actresses
British people in British Guiana